The 1994/95 season in Dutch football saw Ajax Amsterdam winning the title in the Eredivisie, while Feyenoord Rotterdam won the Dutch National Cup. For the first time in history of Dutch professional football a club stayed unbeaten in the highest league. Ajax suffered only one loss that year, losing to Feyenoord in the cup.

Super Cup

Eredivisie

Champions League : Ajax
Cup Winners Cup: Feyenoord
UEFA Cup: Roda JC and PSV
Promotion / relegation play-offs ("Nacompetitie"): MVV and Go Ahead Eagles
Relegated: Dordrecht '90

Topscorers

Awards

Dutch Footballer of the Year
 1994 — Ronald de Boer (Ajax Amsterdam)
 1995 — Luc Nilis (PSV Eindhoven)

Dutch Golden Shoe Winner
 1994 — Ed de Goey (Feyenoord Rotterdam)
 1995 — Danny Blind (Ajax Amsterdam)

Title-winning squad

Goal
 Fred Grim
 Edwin van der Sar

Defence
 Danny Blind
 Frank de Boer
 Winston Bogarde
 Michael Reiziger
 Frank Rijkaard
 Sonny Silooy
 Mendel Witzenhausen

Midfield
 Ronald de Boer
 John van den Brom
 Edgar Davids
 Michel Kreek
 Jari Litmanen
 Kiki Musampa
 Tarik Oulida
 Martijn Reuser
 Clarence Seedorf

Attack
 Finidi George
 Nwankwo Kanu
 Patrick Kluivert
 Marc Overmars
 Peter van Vossen
 Nordin Wooter

Management
 Louis van Gaal (coach)
 Gerard van der Lem (assistant)
 Bobby Haarms (assistant)

Eerste Divisie

Promotion and relegation

Group A

Group B

Promoted : Fortuna Sittard and De Graafschap
Relegated: Dordrecht '90 and MVV Maastricht

KNVB Cup

Dutch national team

References
 RSSSF Archive
 Epsig